Sir John Anstruther, 4th Baronet and 1st Baronet PC (27 March 1753 – 26 January 1811) was a Scottish politician.

The second son of Sir John Anstruther, 2nd Baronet, he was knighted in 1797, raised to the Baronetage of Great Britain in 1798, and also succeeded as 4th Baronet in the Baronetage of Nova Scotia on the death of his elder brother, Philip, in 1808.

He served as Member of Parliament for Anstruther Burghs, in Fife, from 1783 to 1790, 1796–1797 and 1806–1811, and for Cockermouth, in Cumberland, from 1790 to 1796.  He was appointed a Privy Counsellor in 1806.

Life
He was born on 27 March 1753, the second son of Sir John Anstruther of Elie House, Fife. He was educated at Glasgow University under John Millar, and called to the bar at Lincoln's Inn in 1779. He practised chiefly before the House of Lords in Scotch appeals and was M.P. for Cockermouth, 1790–96.

He was an active supporter of Charles James Fox, and one of the managers appointed to conduct the Impeachment of Warren Hastings, his duty being to sum up the evidence on the charge relating to Benares, and to open the charge relating to presents. In 1797 he was appointed Chief Justice of Bengal and created a baronet in 1798. From 1799 to 1807 he was President of the Asiatic Society of Bengal. In 1806 he returned to Britain, was sworn on the privy council and re-entered parliament the same year as member for the Anstruther district of burghs.

In 1808 he succeeded to his father's baronetcy in addition to his own. He died in London 26 January 1811 and was succeeded by his son Sir John Carmichael-Anstruther, 5th Baronet, who also took his place as MP for Anstruther Burghs.

Family

His daughter Marion Anstruther (1797-1859) married his nephew Robert Anstruther WS (1803-1867) and is buried with him in Dean Cemetery.

References

Attribution

1753 births
1811 deaths
Alumni of the University of Glasgow
Members of Lincoln's Inn
Baronets in the Baronetage of Great Britain
Baronets in the Baronetage of Nova Scotia
Members of the Parliament of Great Britain for Scottish constituencies
Members of the Parliament of Great Britain for English constituencies
British MPs 1780–1784
British MPs 1784–1790
British MPs 1790–1796
British MPs 1796–1800
Cumbria MPs
Members of the Privy Council of the United Kingdom
Members of the Parliament of the United Kingdom for Scottish constituencies
Members of the Parliament of the United Kingdom for Fife constituencies
UK MPs 1806–1807
UK MPs 1807–1812
British India judges
Presidents of The Asiatic Society
19th-century Scottish politicians
John, 4th Baronet